The University of Asmara (UoA) was a public university in Asmara, Eritrea. The nation's first university, it was founded in 1958 by the "Piae Madres Nigritiae" (Comboni Sisters). The school was meant to provide for the local population, though its initial enrollment in the 1950s was entirely Italian. Over the course of its history it has been reopened and reorganised following political changes. In 2006 it was closed and reorganized into other institutions such as the Eritrea Institute of Technology.

History
The university was founded as the "Catholic College of Santa Famiglia" in 1958 by the "Piae Madres Nigritiae" (Comboni Sisters). In 1964 the university had been renamed as "University of Asmara" and began offering Associate Diploma programs in the arts, commerce, and the sciences. The roots of the university are connected to the 1940s when Dr. Vincenzo Di Meglio promoted the creation of the "School of Medicine" in Italian Asmara. It is also linked historically to the Istituto Italiano Statale Omnicomprensivo di Asmara.

In 1979 the new president pushed through a major reorganization of the curriculum and structure. The next years saw an increase in students from 300 to 2700. New courses, staff, day and evening extension programs and campus buildings revived the university, together with a bilateral agreement to exchange students and faculty with the University of Addis Ababa, particularly focusing on graduate training in Addis Ababa to produce faculty for Eritrea. In the 1980s, the Arid Zone Agricultural College was established as a faculty.

After Eritrean independence 
The university stopped new student enrollments in 2003. In 2003, the government issued a directive re-configuring prospective students to one of five tertiary education institutions that opened after new admission to the university was stopped such as the Eritrea Institute of Technology. The Eritrean government worked out in its program that the university was restructured and its resources reallocated to new institutions of higher education.

See also 
 Education in Eritrea

References

Bibliography
 
 Feagles, Shelley M. (1999). A Guide to Educational Systems Around the World. Washington, D.C.: NAFSA: Association of International Educators. .

 
Universities in Eritrea
Educational institutions established in 1958
Educational institutions disestablished in 2006
Organisations based in Asmara
1958 establishments in Ethiopia
2006 disestablishments in Africa